Chaenactis nevadensis, with  the common name Nevada dustymaiden, is a North American species of flowering plant in the daisy family.

Distribution and habitat
It is native to the high mountains of eastern California, including the Sierra Nevada from Shasta County to western Inyo County, with a few populations in Washoe County, Nevada; and into the southernmost Cascade Range.

The species grows in sandy or gravelly soils in subalpine habitats.

Description
Chaenactis nevadensis is a perennial herb growing several short stems just a few centimeters high surrounded by a basal rosette of small, woolly, multilobed leaves. The inflorescence arises on a short peduncle. Each flower head is lined with rigid, blunt-tipped, glandular phyllaries. The flower head contains several white or pink flowers with long, protruding anthers. The fruit is an achene with a pappus of scales.

References

External links
Calflora Database: Chaenactis nevadensis (Nevada dustymaiden,  Northern Sierra chaenactis, Sierra chaenactis)
Jepson Manual eFlora (TJM2) treatment of Chaenactis nevadensis
USDA Plants Profile for Chaenactis nevadensis

nevadensis
Flora of California
Flora of Nevada
Flora of the Sierra Nevada (United States)
Endemic flora of the United States
Plants described in 1873
Taxa named by Asa Gray
Taxa named by Albert Kellogg